Enrique Sánchez Carrasco (28 March 1928 – 19 August 2021) was a Spanish politician and teacher. A member of the Spanish Socialist Workers' Party (PSOE), he served as Mayor of Huesca from 1983 to 1995.

Biography
After earning a law degree from the University of Valencia, Carrasco worked as a secondary school teacher in Tarragona, Valencia, Córdoba, and Huesca.

In 1979, Carrasco was elected to serve on the Municipal Council of Huesca and acted as a spokesman for the PSOE within the city. In 1983, he was elected Mayor and was re-elected in 1987 and 1991.

Enrique Sánchez Carrasco died in Huesca on 19 August 2021 at the age of 93.

References

1928 births
2021 deaths
20th-century Spanish politicians
Mayors of places in Aragon
University of Valencia alumni
Spanish schoolteachers
Spanish Socialist Workers' Party politicians
People from the Province of Cuenca